Ransome & Marles F.C. was an English football club based in Newark on Trent.  They were the works team of Ransome & Marles.

History

Ransome and Marles had joined the Yorkshire League for the 1939/40 season but of course the competition was suspended on the outbreak of war.

The club were members of the Midland League from 1945 to 1950, finishing as runners-up in their first campaign.

The club were members of the Central Alliance from 1950 to 1968, they were Division One Champions  in 1955-56 and Division Two Champions in 1960–61.

They also competed in the FA Cup from 1927–28 to 1961–62, reaching the 4th Qualifying Round in 1948.

References

Defunct football clubs in Nottinghamshire
East Midlands Regional League
Midland Football League (1889)
Central Alliance
Newark-on-Trent
Works association football teams in England